Robert Péguy (14 December 1883 – 21 July 1968) was a French film director best known for his films of the 1920s and 1930s.

He directed some 30 films between 1910 and 1946. His career peaked in the 1930s.

Selected filmography
 600,000 Francs a Month (1926)
 Croquette (1927)
 Kiss Me (1929)
 His Highness Love (1931)
 Clochard (1932)
 Jacques and Jacotte (1936)
 The Mysterious Lady (1936)
 My Little Marquise (1937)
 Notre-Dame de la Mouise (1941)

External links 

French film directors
Silent film directors
French male screenwriters
20th-century French screenwriters
1883 births
1968 deaths
Writers from Paris
20th-century French male writers